M jak miłość  (lit. L for Love) is a Polish soap opera, revolving around the multiple generations of the Mostowiak family. The series premiered on 4 November 2000 on TVP2, primarily as a weekly drama, and after one season shifted into a new timeslot and extended to two (and occasionally three) episodes per week. For the last few years the show has been the most watched drama on Polish television. Its popularity led to a Russian adaptation, entitled Lyubov kak Lyubov.

The series is also broadcast on the international channel TVP Polonia with English subtitles.

Current cast members

Past cast members

Special guest cast members

Characters

Mostowiak family 

 Ludwik Mostowiak

 Teodor Mostowiak
 oo Maria Mostowiak

Hanna Smine (Mostowiak, born 1922, died 1978)
 oo husband Smine

 daughter Bufford (Smine)
 oo husband Bufford

 Jane Bufford (born 1990, United States, Joanna Osyda)

Lucjan Mostowiak (born 1931, died 2017, Gródek, Witold Pyrkosz)
 oo Barbara Mostowiak (Wrzodak, married 1960, widowed 2017, Teresa Lipowska)

 Maria Rogowska (Mostowiak, born 1960, biological daughter of Barbara Mostowiak and Zenon Łagoda, Małgorzata Pieńkowska)
 oo Krzysztof Zduński (married 1984, widowed 2006, Cezary Morawski)
 oo Artur Rogowski (married 2008, divorced 2015; married 2018, Grabina, Robert Moskwa)

 Paweł Zduński (born 1984, Gródek, Rafał Mroczek)
 oo Joanna Zduńska (Liberadzka, married 2011, Warsaw, divorced 2012, Agnieszka Więdłocha)
 oo Alicja Zduńska (Domańska, married 2014, Warsaw, divorced 2017, Olga Frycz)
 oo Katia Zduńska (Tatirszwili, married 2018, Warsaw, divorced 2018, Joanna Jarmołowicz)
 oo Franciszka Zduńska (Janik, engaged 2021, married 2022, Dominika Kachlik)

 Barbara Zduńska (Domańska, born 2006, biological daughter of Alicja Zduńska and Jerzy Domański, Gabriela Raczyńska)

 Piotr Zduński (born 1984, Gródek, Marcin Mroczek)
 oo Kinga Zduńska (Filarska, married 2002, Gródek, married 2009, Warsaw, Katarzyna Cichopek-Hakiel)

 Magdalena Zduńska (born 2008, Warsaw, Maria Głowacka)
 Mikołaj Zduński (born 2014, Warsaw, Aleksander Bożyk)
 Emilia Zduńska (born 2019, Warsaw, Marcelina Kempka)
 Zuzanna Zduńska (born 2019, Warsaw, Julia Kempka)

 Maria Zduńska (born 2001, dead 2001, Gródek)

 Barbara Rogowska (born 2009 in Gródek, "Diana Dudzińska", "Maja Wudkiewicz", Karina Woźniak)

 Marta Budzyńska (Mostowiak, born 1972, Gródek, Dominika Ostałowska)
 oo Jacek Milecki (married 2003, divorced 2004, Robert Gonera)
 oo Norbert Wojciechowski (married 2005, widowed 2007, Mariusz Sabiniewicz)
 oo Andrzej Budzyński (married 2012, divorced 2017, Krystian Wieczorek)

 Łukasz Wojciechowski (born 1993, Warsaw, Franciszek Przybylski, Adrian Żuchewicz, Jakub Józefowicz)

 Natalia Wojciechowska (born 2020, Warsaw, daughter of Katia Tatiszwili)

 Jan Wojciechowski (born 2022, Gródek, son of Patrycja Argasińska)

 Anna Wojciechowska (born 2006, Warsaw, Justyna Amerlik, Julia Paćko, Weronika Wachowska, Gabriela Świerczyńska)

 Marek Mostowiak (born Gródek, Kacper Kuszewski)
 oo Hanna Mostowiak (Walisiak, married 2001, widowed 2011, Małgorzata Kożuchowska)
 oo Ewa Mostowiak (Kolęda, married 2014, Dominika Kluźniak)

 Natalia Zarzycka (Mostowiak, born 1996, adopted daughter of Hanna Mostowiak and Marek Mostowiak, Marcjanna Lelek)
 oo Franciszek Zarzycki (married 2017, divorced 2020, Piotr Nerlewski)

 Hanna Mostowiak (born 2015, Grabina, biological daughter of Natalia Mostowiak and Dariusz Maj, Maja Marczak)

 Urszula Mostowiak (Jakubczyk, born 1996, biological daughter of Bronisław Jakubczyk, adopted daughter of Hanna Mostowiak and Marek Mostowiak, Iga Krefft)
 oo Bartosz Lisiecki (married 2019, Arkadiusz Smoleński)

 Mateusz Mostowiak (born 2002, Grabina, Krystian Domagała)
 oo Liliana Mostowiak (Banach, married 2020, divorced 2021, Monika Mielnicka)

 Małgorzata Chodakowska (Mostowiak, born 1980, Gródek, Joanna Koroniewska-Dowbor)
 oo Michał Łagoda (married 2002, divorced 2004, engaged 2014, died 2014, Paweł Okraska)
 oo Stefan Miller (married 2004, divorced 2005, Steffen Möller)
 oo Tomasz Chodakowski (married 2009, divorced 2014, died 2017, Andrzej Młynarczyk)

 Zofia Chodakowska (Warakomska, born 1999, biological daughter of Halina Warakomska and Wojciech Warakomski, adopted daughter of Małgorzata Chodakowska and Tomasz Chodakowski, Julia Wróblewska)
 Wojciech Chodakowski (born 2009, Warsaw) Franciszek Korzeniewski, Feliks Matecki)

Łagoda family 
Feliks Łagoda (born 1896, died 1960)
oo Zofia Łagoda

 Zenon Łagoda (born 1936, died 2001)
 oo wife Łagoda (married, widowed)

 Maria Rogowska (Mostowiak, born 1960, biological daughter of Barbara Mostowiak and Zenon Łagoda, legal daughter of Lucjan Mostowiak)
 oo Krzysztof Zduński (married 1984, widowed 2006)
 oo Artur Rogowski (married 2008, divorced 2015; married 2018, Grabina)

 Paweł Zduński (born 1984, Gródek)
 oo Joanna Zduńska (Liberadzka, married 2011, Warsaw, divorced 2012)
 oo Alicja Zduńska (Domańska, married 2014, Warsaw, divorced 2017)
 oo Katia Zduńska (Tatirszwili, married 2018, divorced 2018, Warsaw)
 oo Franciszka Zduńska (Janik, married 2022)

 Barbara Zduńska (Rogowska, biological daughter of Alicja Zduńska and her former boyfriend)

 Piotr Zduński (born 1984, Gródek)
 oo Kinga Zduńska (Filarska, married 2002, Gródek, married 2009, Warsaw)

 Magdalena Zduńska (born 2009, Warsaw)
 Mikołaj Zduński (born 2014, Warsaw)
 Emilia Zduńska (born 2019, Warsaw)
 Zuzanna Zduńska (born 2019, Warsaw)

 Maria Zduńska (born 2001, dead 2001, Gródek)

 Barbara Rogowska (born 2009, Gródek)

 Michał Łagoda (born 1974, United States, died 2014, Los Angeles)
 oo Małgorzata Chodakowska (Mostowiak, married 2002, divorced 2004, engaged 2014)
 oo Grażyna Łagoda (Raczyńska, married 2009, divorced 2012)

 Marian Łagoda (died 2003, United States)

 Mr. Starski (Łagoda, died, United States)

 Mr. Starski

 Kamil Starski (died 2019, United States)

Filarski family 
 Zbigniew Filarski
 oo Krystyna Filarska-Marszałek (married (?), divorced 2010)

 Kinga Zduńska (Filarska, born 1984, Gródek)
 oo Piotr Zduński (married 2002, Gródek, married 2009, Warsaw)

 Magdalena Zduńska (born 2008, Warsaw)
 Mikołaj Zduński (born 2014, Warsaw)
 Emilia Zduńska (born 2019, Warsaw)
 Zuzanna Zduńska (born 2019, Warsaw)

Marszałek family 
 Wojciech Marszałek
 oo Halina Marszałek (married, widowed 2010)
 oo Krystyna Filarska-Marszałek (married 2011)

 Magdalena Budzyńska (Marszałek, born 1984)
 oo Sasza Maksymowicz (married 2004, divorced 2005)
 oo Aleksander Chodakowski (married 2016, divorced 2017)
 oo Andrzej Budzyński (married 2019)

 Maciej Chodakowski (Romanowski, adopted son of Magdalena Marszałek and Aleksander Chodakowski)

Chodakowski family

Awards

2004
 Polish, television awards "Telekamera 2004" in the category Serial
 Polish, television awards "Teleekrany 2004" in the category Serial
 Polish, television awards "Telekamery 2004" in the category Best Actress – Małgorzata Kożuchowska (Hania Mostowiak)
 Polish, television awards "Teleekrany 2004" in the category Best Actress – Teresa Lipowska (Barbara Mostowiak)
2005
 Polish, television awards "Telekamera 2005" in the category Serial
 Polish, television awards "Telekamera 2005" in the category Best Actress – Małgorzata Kożuchowska (Hania Mostowiak)
 Polish, television awards "Telekamera 2005" in the category Best Actor – Witold Pyrkosz (Lucjan Mostowiak)
2006
 Polish, television awards "Telekamera 2006" in the category Serial
2007
 Polish, television awards "Telekamera 2007" – "Gold Telekamera" (3 prizes "Telekamera" in the category Serial)
 Polish, television awards "Telekamery 2007" – "Złote Spinki" (Gold Studs) – honorary awards – Witold Pyrkosz (Lucjan Mostowiak)
2013
 "Platinum Telekamera"
2015
 Polish, television awards "Telekamera 2015" in the category Best Actress – Barbara Kurdej-Szatan (Joanna Chodakowska)
2016
 Polish, television awards "Telekamera 2016" in the category Best Actress – Barbara Kurdej-Szatan (Joanna Chodakowska)
2017
 Polish, television awards "Telekamera 2017" in the category Best Actress – Barbara Kurdej-Szatan (Joanna Chodakowska)
2018
 Polish, television awards "Telekamera 2018" – "Gold Telekamera" (3 prizes "Telekamera" in the category Best Actress – Barbara Kurdej-Szatan (Joanna Chodakowska))
 Polish, television awards "Telekamera 2018" in the category Best Actor – Mikołaj Roznerski (Marcin Chodakowski)
2019
 Polish, television awards "Telekamera 2019" in the category Best Actor – Mikołaj Roznerski (Marcin Chodakowski)
2020
 Polish, television awards "Telekamera 2020" in the category Best Actor – Mikołaj Roznerski (Marcin Chodakowski)
2021
 Polish, television awards "Telekamera 2021" – "Gold Telekamera" (3 prizes "Telekamera" in the category Best Actor – Mikołaj Roznerski (Marcin Chodakowski))

Notes

External links
 M jak Miłość – official site

References

Polish television soap operas
2000 Polish television series debuts
2000s Polish television series
2010s Polish television series
2020s Polish television series
Television shows set in Warsaw
Telewizja Polska original programming